Aleksandra Kowalczuk (born 18 December 1996) is a Polish taekwondo practitioner. She is the European heavyweight champion as she won the gold medal at the 2018 European Taekwondo Championships on the +73 kg weight category beating the world champion Bianca Walkden in the grand final.

References

External links
 

1996 births
Living people
Polish female taekwondo practitioners
Universiade medalists in taekwondo
People from Hrubieszów
Universiade silver medalists for Poland
European Games competitors for Poland
Taekwondo practitioners at the 2015 European Games
European Taekwondo Championships medalists
Medalists at the 2017 Summer Universiade
Taekwondo practitioners at the 2020 Summer Olympics
Olympic taekwondo practitioners of Poland
21st-century Polish women